Neptune Nunataks is a small group of nunataks between the Chester and Fosdick Mountains, in the Ford Ranges, Marie Byrd Land. Mapped by the United States Antarctic Service (USAS) (1939–41) and by United States Geological Survey (USGS) from surveys and U.S. Navy air photos (1959–65). Named by Advisory Committee on Antarctic Names (US-ACAN) for Gary R. Neptune, geologist with the Marie Byrd Land Survey II, 1967–68 season.

Nunataks of Marie Byrd Land